The 1st Cinemalaya Independent Film Festival was held from July 12 until 17, 2005 in Metro Manila, Philippines.

Entries 
The following films are entries to the New Breed: Full-Length Feature section of Cinemalaya. The winning film is highlighted with boldface and a dagger.

Full-Length Features

Short films

Awards 
Full-Length Features
Best Film: Pepot Artista by Clodualdo del Mundo Jr.
Special Jury Prize: Ang Pagdadalaga ni Maximo Oliveros by Auraeus Solito
Best Direction: Rica Arevalo for ICU Bed #7
Best Performance of an Actor: Eddie Garcia for ICU Bed #7
Special Citation (for acting performance): Nathan Lopez for Ang Pagdadalaga ni Maximo Oliveros
Best Performance of an Actress: Meryll Soriano for Room Boy
Best Screenplay: Mario Cornejo and Monster Jimenez for Big Time
Best Cinematography: Rodolfo Aves Jr. for Baryoke
Best Sound Design: Allan Feliciano and Raffy Magsaysay for Big Time
Best Editing: Daniel Adapon for Pepot Artista
Best Production Design: Lily Esquillon for Ang Pagdadalaga ni Maximo Oliveros

Short Films
Best Film: Mansyon by Joel Ruiz
Special Jury Prize: Kultado by Lawrence Fajardo
Best Direction: Sigrid Andrea Bernardo for Babae
Best Screenplay: Pamela Miras for Blood Bank

Jury 
Selected for the Jury were:
Eddie Romero
Philip Cheah
Johnny Delgado
Mark Meily
Nestor U. Torre

References

External links 
Cinemalaya Independent Film Festival

C
C
2005 in Philippine cinema
Cinemalaya Independent Film Festival